Jezero is a village in the Municipality of Brezovica in central Slovenia. The  municipality is part of the traditional region of Inner Carniola and is now included in the Central Slovenia Statistical Region. It includes the hamlets of Zaledine, Virje, and Zaobloka.

Geography

Jezero is a clustered village on a semicircular plain between Saint Anne's Church to the west and Saint Lawrence's Church to the northeast. The lake is fed by several springs in the nearby forest and contains trout, carp, and pike. The main tributary of the lake is Mill Creek (Mlinski potok), a constant surface watercourse. The lake drains through a siphon at the bottom, later emerging to the northwest as Hruški Creek (Hruški potok), a tributary of the Ljubljanica River. Swimming is permitted in the lake at one's own risk. Below Saint Lawrence's church are several sets of fields known by the microtoponyms Rušne, Deli, and Cervenke. A water main is connected to Jezero from the hamlet of Podkamnik in the neighboring village of Kamnik pod Krimom. There are several karst caves in the vicinity, including Frog Caves (Krkonove jame), Peršin Shaft (Peršinovo brezno), Little Woods Cave (jama v Malih gozdih), Lipovec Shaft (brezno v Lipovcu), and Big Peak Shaft (brezno pod Velikim vrhom).

Name
The name Jezero means 'lake' in Slovene. Jezero was attested in written sources as See in 1385 and Sëe in 1409.

Churches

The local church, built on a small hill north of the settlement, is dedicated to Saint Lawrence and originally dates to the 12th century, but was restyled in the 18th century. A second church, dedicated to Saint Anne, stands on a hill to the west of the settlement. It was also originally a Gothic building, but was rebuilt in the late 16th or early 17th century. Both belong to the Parish of Preserje.

Gallery

References

External links

Jezero on Geopedia

Populated places in the Municipality of Brezovica